Lapvona is a 2022 novel by Ottessa Moshfegh. It is Moshfegh's fifth novel.

Synopsis
In Lapvona, a corrupt medieval fiefdom, deformed 13 year-old Marek lives with his cruel shepherd father Jude and was nursed from birth by the village witch. When Marek commits a crime, the cruel lord Villiam demands that Jude give Marek to him as reparations, and Marek goes to live in his castle.

Background
Lapvona was written by Moshfegh during the COVID-19 pandemic and was announced on April 12, 2021. The novel was published by Penguin Press on June 21, 2022.

Reception
At the review aggregator website Book Marks, which assigns individual ratings to book reviews from mainstream literary critics, the novel received a cumulative "Mixed" rating based on 27 reviews: 7 "Rave" reviews, 5 "Positive" reviews, 5 "Mixed" reviews, and 10 "Pan" review.

In a review for the New York Times, Dwight Garner criticized the novel for lacking Moshfegh's typical wit, and that it is "narrow in its emotional range, a bleak, meandering and muddy-soled mix of fairy tale and folk horror." Kirkus Reviews compared the novel to Moshfegh's earlier works and found the tone "stiff" and the plot "meandering". The reviewer at Publishers Weekly, however, found the book "deliriously quirky" and declared it "a triumph".

References 

2022 American novels
Novels by Ottessa Moshfegh
Penguin Press books
Jonathan Cape books